Kerala Football League (KFL) 1999 / Kerala State Football League 1999 is the second season of football league in Kerala organised by Kerala Football Association . The current champions FC Kochin retain the title.

The second edition of Kerala Football League held in Kochi and Kollam in December 1999. FC Kochin club won the tille. SBT Trivandrum become the runners up.

Teams

Group A:
Central Excise Kochi, Kerala Police, FACT, KSEB.

Group B:
SBT, Titanium, Keltron.

Preliminary round

Group A 

 

(C: 9, 73 Lloyd, 80 ;)

Group B

Super League 1999

Last season champion FC Kochin directly qualified to super league stage.

(S:  , 38 ; 8 )

References

Football in Kerala
Football competitions in India